Ally Gilchrist (born 3 March 1995) is a Scottish professional footballer who plays as a defender for Cork City. He has previously played for St Johnstone, Elgin City, Peterhead, Shamrock Rovers, Derry City and Shelbourne.

Career
Ally has been in the St Johnstone youth ranks since 2011. During this time he has spent the majority of his career on loan in Scotland's lower leagues, firstly with Elgin City and then with Peterhead.  He made his St Johnstone debut in a 2017–18 UEFA Europa League match against FK Trakai. Gilchrist was released by St Johnstone in December 2017. He signed for League of Ireland Premier Division club Shamrock Rovers soon after his release for the year of 2018 and was transferred to Derry City for 2019, where he played for two seasons. In December 2020, he left Derry to join recently relegated Shelbourne in the League of Ireland First Division.

After winning the 2021 First Division title with Shelbourne, Gilchrist signed for Cork City for the 2022 season to win it again.

Career statistics
Professional appearances – correct as of 2 February 2022.

Honours
Shelbourne
League of Ireland First Division: 2021

Cork City
League of Ireland First Division: 2022

References

External links

1995 births
Living people
Scottish footballers
Association football defenders
St Johnstone F.C. players
Elgin City F.C. players
Peterhead F.C. players
Scottish Professional Football League players
Footballers from Edinburgh
Shamrock Rovers F.C. players
Derry City F.C. players
Shelbourne F.C. players
Cork City F.C. players